Codon may refer to any of the following:

 a three-base sequence of DNA that encodes a single amino acid in the genetic code
 Codon (plant), a genus of plants in the family Boraginaceae
 Codon (planthopper), a genus of insects in the family Fulgoridae